Lance Nimmo (born September 13, 1979) is a former American football offensive tackle of the National Football League (NFL).  

A native of New Castle, Pennsylvania, Nimmo played college football at West Virginia and competed in 44 games. He was a two-year starter at left tackle and earned first-team all-conference as a senior as part of an offensive line that yielded only one sack all season. Nimmo was also Academic All-Big East for all four years. He was represented by agent Joe Lenta. In addition to football, Nimmo competed in pedal tractor pulls growing up, which his father, Bob Nimmo, credited as helping his conditioning.

He was drafted by the Tampa Bay Buccaneers in the fourth round of the 2003 NFL Draft. Nimmo went to Japan as part of a preseason game for the Buccaneers but was waived after training camp. He spent the 2003 season on the active roster of the New York Jets, though he never played in a game. He spent the spring of 2004 in NFL Europe, starting 10 games for the Cologne Centurions.  Nimmo was signed to the New England Patriots for the 2004–2005 season. Despite remaining on the practice squad, he earned a Super Bowl ring after the Patriots won Super Bowl XXXIX.
Nimmo has no official NFL statistics, having only one season as an active, competitive player (with no game time), and having only worked on practice squads in other years. 

, Nimmo is a math teacher at Sharpsville Area Middle School, in Sharpsville, Pennsylvania. He is a member of the Laurel School Board.

References

External links
West Virginia Mountaineers bio

1979 births
Living people
People from New Castle, Pennsylvania
American football offensive tackles
West Virginia Mountaineers football players
Tampa Bay Buccaneers players
New York Jets players
Cologne Centurions (NFL Europe) players
Cleveland Browns players
New England Patriots players
Players of American football from Pennsylvania